The Massacre of Broniki referred to the killing of members of the Wehrmacht by soldiers of the Red Army, on 1 July 1941 near the place , Rivne Raion in western Ukraine. 

Some members of the battalion survived, although seriously injured, or had been able to flee. They said later in the investigation hearing before the judge of the 25th Division Infantry Division (mot) Dr. Henrich and three other army judges, commissioned by the Wehrmacht-investigating authority with the investigation into the incident, the prisoners had to undress and leave valuables. After that they were shot. Also injuries from hand grenades and bayonets have been reported.

On 21 March 1983, the West German Radio (WDR) broadcast a documentary, which was based on de Zayas' investigation and also showed propaganda footage of the troops of the Wehrmacht on the massacre; witnesses talked to journalists in the documentary.

See also
Massacre of Grischino
Massacre of Feodosia

References

1941 in the Soviet Union
Soviet World War II crimes
World War II prisoner of war massacres by the Soviet Union
Rivne Oblast
July 1941 events